Desiderio is both a surname and a given name in Italian, Spanish and Portuguese (Desidério), derived from the Latin Desiderius. 
Notable people with the name include:

Surname:
Monsù Desiderio (1593–1620), French painter
Reginald B. Desiderio (1918–1950), soldier in the United States Army
Desiderio Army Airfield, Pyeongtaek, South Korea, named after Reginald B. Desiderio
Robert Desiderio (born 1951), American actor
Vincent Desiderio (born 1955), American realist painter

Given name:
Desiderio Costa (born 1934), Angolan politician
Desiderio da Settignano (c.1430–1464), Italian sculptor
Desi Arnaz (1917–1986), Cuban-born American entertainer

Film
 Desire (1946 Italian film), a 1946 film known by this title in Italian

See also

Desiderius (given name)
Didier (disambiguation)
Dizier